Tiana's Bayou Adventure is an upcoming log flume attraction at Disneyland and Magic Kingdom in the United States. It is based on Disney's 2009 film The Princess and the Frog. The attraction is scheduled to open in 2024, and will be a redesign of Splash Mountain.

Development
In June 2020, it was announced that the Splash Mountain attraction themed to Disney's 1946 film Song of the South at Disneyland and Magic Kingdom, would be re-themed based on the 2009 film The Princess and the Frog. Disney stated that the development of the project began in 2019, prior to the online petitions that were circulated during the George Floyd protests. The New York Times reported that Disney executives had privately discussed removing the attraction's Song of the South theme for at least five years, before putting into development a theme based on The Princess and the Frog. The project will be led by Walt Disney Imagineer Senior Creative Producer Charita Carter with Splash Mountain Imagineer Tony Baxter returning as a creative advisor.

In August 2021, new artwork and details for the retheme were revealed. In July 2022, Disney announced that the new ride, Tiana's Bayou Adventure, will open at both parks in late 2024. 

At the D23 Expo in September 2022, it was confirmed that Anika Noni Rose, Bruno Campos, Michael-Leon Wooley, and Jenifer Lewis would be reprising their roles from the film for the ride.

In December 2022, new artwork was unveiled and it was announced that the Magic Kingdom version of Splash Mountain would close on January 23, 2023. The closing date for the Disneyland version has yet to be announced.

Since the setting of Tiana's Bayou Adventure is New Orleans, which is very much a flat city, the Imagineers have stated that the attraction's elevation is explained by having it take place on a salt dome, inspired by Avery Island in Louisiana. In addition, the new characters for the ride were designed by Imagineer Laura West, while Eric Goldberg, who animated Louis in the film, was consulted for the character's inclusion.

To prepare for the attraction, the Imagineering team took several research trips to Louisiana, visiting locations such as the French Market and bayous, consulted with cultural institutions, chefs, academics, musicians, and also experienced Mardi Gras in New Orleans.

Attraction
The attraction is set a year after the events of The Princess and the Frog. To help her community, Tiana has created an employee-owned Food cooperative called Tiana's Foods, built on a salt dome that she has purchased. On the day that guests visit, it is Carnival season and Tiana is hosting a celebration for the people of New Orleans. She realizes that her celebration is missing a key ingredient and needs the guests' help to find it, as they join her and Louis on a trip to the bayou. In addition, the attraction will include new characters.

Voice Cast
 Anika Noni Rose as Tiana
 Bruno Campos as Prince Naveen
 Jenifer Lewis as Mama Odie
 Michael-Leon Wooley as Louis

References

 

Walt Disney Parks and Resorts attractions
Disneyland
Magic Kingdom
Dark rides
Critter Country
Frontierland
Audio-Animatronic attractions 
Amusement rides planned to open in 2024
The Princess and the Frog
The Frog Prince